The Vigilante is a 1947 American Western film serial directed by Wallace Fox. The 33rd serial released by Columbia Pictures, it was based on the comic book cowboy Vigilante, who first appeared in  Action Comics, published by DC Comics. It stars Ralph Byrd, well known for his central role in the Dick Tracy serials. It was his last serial appearance.

Plot
The Vigilante, a masked government agent, is assigned to investigate the case of the "100 Tears of Blood", a cursed string of rare blood-red pearls sought by a gang led by the unknown X-1 that may have been smuggled into the country.

Greg Sanders (Sanders at that time, later changed to Saunders in the comics), in his civilian guise as an actor, is filming a western on George Pierce's ranch. Pierce is a wealthy rancher and nightclub owner. When Prince Hamil arrives at the ranch, he gives a horse each to Sanders, Pierce, Captain Reilly, Tex Collier, and Betty Winslow. But an outlaw gang soon attacks, attempting to steal all five horses. It turns out that each horse has twenty of the pearls hidden in their shoes (five in each) in secret compartments. Edging closer, Sanders learns that Prince Hamil's servant stole the diamonds from his master and smuggled them in on the horses with the intention of passing them on to X-1.

Cast
 Ralph Byrd as Greg Sanders / The Vigilante
 Ramsay Ames as Betty Winslow, rodeo star
 Lyle Talbot as George Pierce
 George Offerman Jr. as Stuff, The Vigilante's sidekick
 Robert Barron as Prince Hamil, dignitary of Aravania. Barron was wrongly listed on-screen as Prince Hassan but referred to as Hamil.
 Hugh Prosser as Captain Reilly, highway patrol officer
 Jack Ingram as Silver Henchman X-2
 Eddie Parker as Doc Henchman X-3
 Tiny Brauer as Thorne Henchman X-9

Production
The Vigilante was originally a comic book character whose first appearance was in Action Comics (Issue #42, November 1941).  He was a singing-cowboy radio performer who doubled as a motorcycle-riding crime-fighter along with a pre-teen Chinese boy, Stuff the Chinatown Kid.

In the serial version, Stuff became a white, draft-age sidekick played by George Offerman Jr. Ralph Byrd was cast as the Vigilante. Director Wallace Fox makes a cameo appearance as the director filming Greg Sanders' movie at George Pierce's ranch.

Chapter titles
 The Vigilante Rides Again
 Mystery of the White Horses
 Double Peril
 Desperate Flight
 In the Gorilla's Cage
 Battling the Unknown
 Midnight Rendezvous
 Blasted to Eternity
 The Fatal Flood
 Danger Ahead
 X-1 Closes In
 Death Rides the Rails
 The Trap that Failed
 Closing In
 The Secret of the Skyroom
Source:

References

External links

The Vigilante article at Todd Gault's Movie Serial Experience
Comic Book Profiles: The Vigilante - the 1947 Movie Serial

1947 films
1940s vigilante films
American black-and-white films
Columbia Pictures film serials
1940s English-language films
Live-action films based on DC Comics
Films directed by Wallace Fox
1947 Western (genre) films
American vigilante films
American Western (genre) films
Films with screenplays by George H. Plympton
1940s American films
Films based on DC Comics